Kramer is an unincorporated rural village in Lancaster County, Nebraska, United States. There is a grainary there, a restaurant, and a community hall, and no other businesses or services. The population was 26 at the 2020 census.

Demographics

History
Kramer was founded in 1888. It was named for Mr. Kramer, the original owner of the town site.

A post office was established in Kramer in 1889, and remained in operation until it was discontinued in 1955.

References

Unincorporated communities in Lancaster County, Nebraska
Unincorporated communities in Nebraska